ISCAR Ltd. is an Israeli multinational metal cutting tools company affiliated with one of the world's largest metalworking conglomerates, the IMC Group (International Metalworking Companies). ISCAR and the IMC Group were acquired by Warren Buffett's Berkshire Hathaway in 2007, becoming one of its largest non-insurance companies.

History
ISCAR was founded in 1952 by Stef Wertheimer, an Israeli metalworker in his backyard. It was originally located in Nahariya. In 1982, it moved to Migdal Tefen (Tefen industrial zone) near Kfar Vradim in the Upper Galilee. Since its inception, ISCAR has expanded from a single-marketing and manufacturing facility to a multinational company with representation in over 50 countries.

In 2007, Berkshire Hathaway, chaired by American investor Warren Buffett, purchased ISCAR and the IMC Group, making it the company's first international acquisition outside the United States. In 2008, Buffett called the acquisition of the IMC Group a "dream deal" that surpassed all his expectations.  In a letter to shareholders, managers were described as "brilliant strategists and operators," and Buffett praised the sales growth and performance of the company as "unique in its industry."

Mr. Jacob Harpaz is the CEO of ISCAR and President of the IMC Group.  Today, the IMC Group comprises 13 companies with 130 subsidiaries in over 60 countries around the globe.

See also
Economy of Israel
Science and technology in Israel

References

External links 
 
 ISCAR Global Companies

Berkshire Hathaway
Manufacturing companies established in 1952
Israeli brands
Manufacturing companies of Israel
Metalworking cutting tools
1952 establishments in Israel